The Edward Hines Jr. Veterans Administration Hospital is a second-generation Veterans Health Administration hospital in Hines, Illinois, United States. It currently encompasses  on its campus and leases an additional  to the Loyola University Medical Center.

Construction began in 1918 on land donated by the Edward Hines Lumber Company that was originally Speedway Park, a board track racecourse. The building was originally intended to house casualties from World War I, and Hines wanted the building to serve as a hospital after the war. Hines was successful in lobbying the United States Congress to take over the facility as a veterans hospital in 1920. In 2013,  of the campus, including the Old Airmail and Postal Service Buildings from the Maywood Air Mail Field, were listed on the National Register of Historic Places as a historic district.

History

Speedway Park and early developments

The history of the property in Hines, Illinois began in 1835, when the land was sold to Frederick Bronson by the United States government. The land was used for farming until 1914, when the Speedway Park Association purchased the  lot to develop a race track. The organization built a  oval wooden track on the land and held races starting in June 1915. The track was one of the longest board tracks in the United States. The course was host to a number of national and international racing competitions featuring competitors such as Barney Oldfield, Ralph DePalma, Louis Chevrolet, and Dario Resta. The track was initially very successful, attracting as many as 45,000 spectators. However, the entry of the United States into World War I in April 1917 doomed the financial viability of the racetrack. It was one of the first board tracks to close; most board tracks in the United States were closed by the end of the 1930s.

Early history
The course was purchased in December 1917 by the Edward Hines Lumber Company on behalf of Edward Hines Sr.  Once the United States entered World War I, the City of Chicago sought a site for a temporary military hospital. Edward Hines Jr. was killed on the front lines in France in the opening months of American involvement in the war. In his memory, Hines Sr. offered to donate his new property as a potential site of the Chicago facility; it was selected in September 1918. The Field Museum of Natural History was also considered as a location for the facility. However, it was feared that the conversion of the museum to a medical facility would prove too costly. The fact that Hines' hospital was built to be a hospital also played in his favor. Hines intended to build a fireproof building that could house casualties during the war and then operate as a public hospital after the war. Schmidt, Garden and Martin and H. B. Wheelock were awarded the commission to design the facility, and the Shank Company was tasked with its construction.

When World War I ended in November 1918, the agreement with Hines was terminated as there was no longer a need to house casualties. The hospital stood partially constructed for the next two years as Hines led an effort to lobby Congress to have the building taken over by the United States Public Health Service. Secretary of the Treasury Carter Glass disapproved of the plan because no official contract was signed between Hines and the federal government. However, an investigation by the United States Department of War found sufficient evidence of a verbal agreement between the two parties. With help from Congressmen Adolph J. Sabath, James Robert Mann, Martin B. Madden, and Carl R. Chindblom, a Senate vote on the matter passed 33 to 27. $3.4 million was appropriated to the project under the condition that Hines provided an additional $1.6 million. The transfer was approved in March 1920 and construction began again.

The campus was originally known as U.S. Public Health Service Hospital Number 76, and was popularly referred to as Speedway Hospital or Broadview Hospital. In honor of his contribution to see the facility completed, on October 24, 1921, President Warren G. Harding declared that the facility was to be renamed to honor Hines' son. It was the first American veterans hospital to be named after a person. The first patient was admitted on August 8, 1921. A dedication ceremony was held on November 6, 1921 led by Marshal of France Ferdinand Foch and Senator Medill McCormick.

1920s–1940s expansions
The Main Infirmary Building was capable of housing a thousand beds, and by February 1922, was already near capacity. It was also the largest fireproof hospital in the nation, and featured many state-of-the-art technologies such as an electric call system and an x-ray department. Seven other buildings were erected during initial construction in 1921: the Morgue and Utility Shops; the Recreational and Library Building; the Kitchen, Chapel, and Social Service Building; the Power House; the Subsistence Building; the Garage; and the Supply Depot. The facility was transferred from the Public Health Service to the recently created Veterans Bureau in April 1922. By 1925, the campus saw over 3,100 admissions per year.

In May 1928, President Calvin Coolidge approved a $15 million appropriation to improve veterans health facilities, including $1.1 million for Hines. With this money, the hospital was able to renovate its staff quarters into tuberculosis and behavioral health wards. They also built a new administration building and employee housing, thus opening more space in the Main Infirmary Building, increasing its capacity to 1,600. It was also at this point that the hospital grounds were extensively landscaped with a sunken garden, a new street lighting system, a new east entrance, and new drives. The landscaping is attributed to Jens Jensen, although it is uncertain if Jensen's design was ever implemented. On July 26, 1931, the Doughboy Fountain was donated by the Cook County American Legion Auxiliary in honor of World War I veterans. A memorial to Medal of Honor recipient George Dilboy, who was killed in the war, was unveiled in 1942. Hines Hospital became the national leader in surgery for veterans facilities, performing over 14,600 procedures per year by 1935.

During World War II, a new eighty-three building complex was built adjacent to the property with a $4.5 million appropriation. Known as the Vaughan General Hospital, it was built on the  grounds of the former Maywood Air Mail Field to serve the needs of the Army. The first patient was admitted on August 1, 1944. The new campus was added to the Hines complex after the war in April 1946, increasing the capacity of Hines from 1,600 to 3,253 beds. The new campus also afforded Hines the opportunity to manufacture some of its medical equipment and establish a medical research division. In 1946, Hines partnered with five medical schools to become a training center.

1960s to present
In 1962, the Department of Health, Education, and Welfare transferred  of the Hines property to the State of Illinois Department of Mental Health so that they could build a new mental health facility. The John J. Madden Clinic took over mental health operations from the hospital, allowing Hines to re-purpose 280 beds to intensive care. Also that year,  of the Vaughan campus were leased to Loyola University Chicago Stritch School of Medicine to build a new medical school. The 451-bed Foster G. McGraw Hospital, later known as the Loyola University Medical Center, opened on May 29, 1969. This partnership allowed Hines to have one of the most comprehensive residency programs among veterans hospitals.

The Vietnam War brought another influx of injured veterans to Hines. In response, a $32 million, 1,200 bed hospital was built from 1966 to 1970 to replace the Main Infirmary Building. A 120-bed Nursing Home Care Unite was completed in 1982 to treat aging veterans of the two World Wars. By the early 1990s, the complex had sixty-two buildings, including one of five Blind Rehabilitation Centers in the Veterans Affairs network. A fifteen-bedroom Ronald McDonald House was added in 1994. By 1996, the facility had serviced 900,000 patients. The most recent developments are a new Blind Rehabilitation Center and Spinal Cord Injury Center in 2005.

Historical recognition
The historic value of the campus was recognized in 1980, when the Old Airmail and Postal Service Buildings were determined to be eligible for the National Register of Historic Places by the National Park Service. The buildings may be the oldest mail airport structures in the United States, serving the Postal Service between 1922 and 1927. Charles Lindbergh piloted the maiden air mail flight between Chicago and St. Louis, Missouri on April 15, 1926. Today, the buildings house a garage and an inflammable storage building. Two years later, the VA hospital was also determined eligible for listing, although neither property was listed in the following decades. These two entities were combined into the Edward Hines Jr. Veterans Administration Hospital Historic District, which was listed on October 9, 2013. The  district includes twenty-six of the early buildings on campus.

References

External links

Official website

Hospital buildings completed in 1918
Government buildings completed in 1918
Buildings and structures on the National Register of Historic Places in Cook County, Illinois
Hospital buildings on the National Register of Historic Places in Illinois
Hospitals in Cook County, Illinois
Veterans Affairs medical facilities
Historic districts on the National Register of Historic Places in Illinois